Yabitsu Dam  is a rockfill dam located in Iwate Prefecture in Japan. The dam is used for flood control. The catchment area of the dam is 15.1 km2. The dam impounds about 11  ha of land when full and can store 927 thousand cubic meters of water. The construction of the dam was started on 1970 and completed in 1981.

See also
List of dams in Japan

References

Dams in Iwate Prefecture